Sir Sheikh Abdul Qadir (15 March 1872 – 9 February 1950) was a Pakistani jurist, newspaper and magazine editor and a Muslim community leader in British India. He was a former judge of Lahore High Court.

He led the famous Muslim organization, Anjuman-i-Himayat-i-Islam and used his position as the leader of this organization to form other, pro-partition, organizations. He was an early activist of the Pakistan Movement.

Early life and career 

Qadir was born in Ludhiana on 15 March 1872. He was the editor of  The Observer, the first Muslim newspaper published in English in 1895.  In 1901, he launched the magazine Makhzan, an Urdu language publication.  This magazine published the early works of Muhammad Iqbal.

In 1904, Qadir went to study law in London, and was called to the bar in 1907 after which he returned to India, where he served as a member of the Punjab Legislative Council and the minister of education in Punjab, British India in 1925.

He is famously well-known for being a judge of the Lahore Conspiracy Case Tribunal constituted in May 1930 especially for speeding up the trial of the suspects for the murder of Lahore Assistant Superintendent Mr. J. P. Saunders. The suspects also included the famous revolutionaries Bhagat Singh, Sukhdev and Rajguru. The trials were held at Poonch House registrar in Lahore. He was the second native Indian judge chosen after the reconstitution of the Tribunal in June after Justice Agha Haider of the first Tribunal had been removed on calumny charges for not maintaining neutrality during the trial. The final judgement that was pronounced in October 1930 was under his jurisdiction.

Qadir was knighted by the British  in the 1927 Birthday Honours and in 1935 became a member of the governing council of India.  He died on 9 February 1950 at the age of 77 and was buried in Miani Sahib Graveyard, Lahore.

Sarvepalli Radhakrishnan and Mohandas Karamchand Gandhi's book Mahatma Gandhi contains a chapter by Qadir, where he particularly relates his various experiences with the understanding of Gandhi  in Europe  in the 1930s.

His son, Manzur Qadir, was a prominent Pakistani jurist  who served as the Foreign Minister of Pakistan during the military rule of Ayub Khan.

References

External links 
S. M. Ikram. Indian Muslims and the Partition of India. (Atlantic Publishers, 1995) p. 282.

1872 births
1950 deaths
Knights Bachelor
Indian Knights Bachelor
Pakistani Muslims
Burials at Miani Sahib Graveyard
Pakistani editors
Pakistan Movement activists
Speakers of the Provincial Assembly of the Punjab
Judges of the Lahore High Court